An inflight magazine (or in-flight magazine) is a free magazine distributed via the seats of an airplane, by an airline company, or in an airport lounge.

Overview
Many airline companies, or a few key content-creating companies, produce in-flight magazines to provide details about their fleet, as well as articles about destinations, travel, and tourism information.

In-flight publishing and media are a niche in the magazine industry. Airline titles have controlled distribution costs, and readership figures come from existing passenger traffic. Most airlines use external publishers to produce their magazines, and Ink is currently the world's leading company in this sector.

In a recent Harris Poll, 94% of business passengers read the in-flight magazines, with a 30-minute average reading time per flight, according to a 2009 Arbitron study. Despite the challenges facing the publishing industry, this is a healthy sector. On a large scale, in-flight magazines have suffered less than traditional magazines overall.

While the quality of in-flight magazines varies from carrier to carrier. Their upscale, valuable, and captive readership appeals to advertisers across all sectors, including luxury-goods makers, car manufacturers, beauty and fashion brands as well as global destinations.

History
The first in-flight magazine was started by Pan American World Airways in around 1952. Its title, Clipper Travel, was a reference to their Boeing 314 Clipper aircraft. A decade later, KLM's Holland Herald,the longest running in-flight magazine, was first published in January 1966. In-flight magazines began booming in the 1980s, with new airlines forming them one after another. Some, including Japan Airlines, had over 300 pages in their magazines. This method of flight entertainment has proved to be a success for airlines around the world. To this day, over 150 in-flight magazines are being published.

However, since the birth of digital technology (and COVID-19), some key airlines are now offering the chance for the magazines to be read digitally via tablet computer applications, or over the internet.

Publishers

Among specialized publishers are:

 Maxposure Media Group, which produces Shubh Yatra for Air India, Spice Route for SpiceJet Airlines, Vistara Magazine for Vistara Airline (JV between Tata Sons and Singapore Airlines), GoGetter for GoAir India, Trujetter for TruJet Airlines, Fly Smiles for Air Pegasus, Gulf Life for Gulf Air out of Bahrain, Nawras for Air Arabia in Sharjah and Morocco, Saudi Gulf Magazine for Saudigulf Airlines in Saudi Arabia and Salam Air in Oman. It has offices in India, United States, Bangladesh, United Arab Emirates, Bahrain, Saudi Arabia, Morocco, Thailand, Malaysia and Singapore. The sales network spans more than 20 countries. It is the largest custom and in-flight magazine publisher in Asia. The company publishes more than 30 in-flight and custom magazines in over 20 languages, and offers a mobile app, digital and social media platforms to its aviation clients.
 Ink is a global media company specialising in content and advertising for the travel sector, headquartered in London. The company works with over 27 airline, rail and hotel partners worldwide (including American Airlines, United, Qatar Airways, Etihad Airways, easyJet and Norwegian), with offices in London, New York, Miami, São Paulo and Singapore. Ink produces over 27 in-flight magazines in 18 languages, and airline mobile apps for their travel partners. Ink offers advertising across magazines, and passenger travel documents (print-at home boarding passes, booking confirmation emails), in airline mobile apps and online properties. Their media channels reach over 783 million passengers every year.
 GroupSixPro, producing KAConfidential, the exclusive in-flight magazine of KaiserAir.
 ExiGent Magazine is the official and exclusive in-flight magazine of several airlines specialized in business jets throughout Europe and Africa. It also is the corporate magazine of one of the largest luxury real estate agencies. The company works with six airline and real estate agency partners (including Afrijet Business Service, Dassault Falcon Service, Jet Net Alliance, Helipass, Coldwell Banker France et Monaco and Sparfell and Partners). ExiGent Magazine produces six in-flight magazines in two languages, French and English.
 Spafax, a multinational editorial and content marketing company based in London, Montréal and Toronto with more than 70 clients around the world. Its 13 offices worldwide – London, Toronto, Montréal, Santiago, Lima, Dubai, Frankfurt, Madrid, Kuala Lumpur, Miami, New York, California, Singapore – produce magazines and IFE products for clients such as British Airways, Air Canada, LAN, and Malaysia Airlines.
 Stream, producing around ten in-flight magazines, including CityJet.
 Agency Fish, whose main client is Srilankan Airlines and Garuda Indonesia.
 Motivate Publishing, which produces the in-flight magazine for Open Skies, and Emirates' business- and first-class magazine, Portfolio.
 Cedar Communications, which produces British Airways' High Life, First Life and Business Life.
 G+J Corporate Editors, which produces Lufthansa Magazin, Lufthansa Woman's world, Lufthansa exclusive and Holland Herald.
 Lagardere France, whose main airline client is Air France.
 Subcontinental Media Group, whose main airline clients are Biman Bangladesh Airlines from Bangladesh and Fly Africa Airlines in South Africa. It publishes Bihanga Magazine for Biman and Flyafrica.com Magazine for Fly Africa. It has offices in Dhaka (Bangladesh), New Delhi, Kolkata in India and Johannesburg in South Africa. SMG has a sales network in over 15 key countries in Europe, Asia, and the Americas.
 Bentang Media Nusantara, whose main airline clients are Lion Air, Wings Air and Batik Air.
 In-flight Media and Technologies, which publishes Max Air's in-flight magazine.
 Panorama Media Corp, are experienced publishers of consumer titles, specialist publications (including Skyways Magazine for Airlink for the last 30 years) and customer magazines, which compete in quality, design and reader appeal at an international level. Panorama Media Corp. is a full-service publishing company offering a one-stop service solution.
 Shuffle CMS, which produces Jet2.coms' JetAway

Specialized advertising agencies of in-flight magazines 

 giO media (in-flight specialist for Benelux, Cyprus and Middle East markets), representing, recommending and centralizing all aspects of in-flight media. It is working for over 75% of all the airlines worldwide, such as British Airways, Air France, KLM, United-Continental, Emirates and Virgin Australia.
 IMM International (in-flight marketing bureau for France, Switzerland, UK, Italy and China markets), representing, recommending and centralizing all aspects of in-flight media. It works with 150 airlines worldwide (more than 200 magazines)
 The Media Ant, representing, recommending and centralizing all aspects of a few airlines. It works with 3 of 12 of the airlines in the country, such as IndiGo, Jetwings and Air Costa.
 In-flight Media and Technologies (in-flight marketing bureau for Max Air in Nigeria), representing and centralizing all aspects of in-flight media for Max Air. It also advertises on board for advertisers inside all Max Air fleets.
 òrkestra, the first media center in Italy specialized exclusively in advertising in in-flight magazines (more than 250 magazines in portfolio) of the most important airlines in the world

List of in-flight magazines

North America

Canada
Air Canada : enRoute and Navi
Air North : Yukon, North of Ordinary
Air Transat: Atmosphere
Porter Airlines : re:Porter
Westjet : UP!

Mexico
Aeroméxico : Aire and Accent
Mexicana de Aviación : VUELO (defunct)
TAESA : Caminos (defunct)
vivaAerobus : enVIVA
Volaris : V de Volaris

United States
AirTran Airways : GO (defunct)
Alaska Airlines : Alaska Beyond
Allegiant Air : Sunseeker
Aloha Airlines : Spirit of Aloha
American Airlines : American Way, CL (Celebrated Living) for First and Business Class, NEXOS for Latin American flights 
Braniff International Airways : Flying Colors (defunct)
Continental Airlines : Continental Magazine (defunct)
Delta Air Lines : Sky Magazine
Eastern Airlines : Review (defunct)
Frontier Airlines : Wild Blue Yonder
Hawaiian Airlines : Hana Hou!
KaiserAir Inc. : KA Confidential
Midwest Airlines : My Midwest Magazine, previously Midwest Airlines Magazine (defunct)
National Airlines : Aloft (defunct)
Northwest Airlines : World Traveler (defunct)
Pan American World Airways : Clipper Magazine (defunct)
SeaPort Airlines : Cloud 9 magazine
Southwest Airlines : Southwest Magazine, previously Spirit Magazine
Spirit Airlines : Skylights
Trans World Airlines : Ambassador Magazine (defunct)
United Airlines : Hemispheres, Rhapsody (defunct) - First Class, Business Class, and United Club magazine
US Airways : US Airways Magazine, previously Attache Magazine (defunct)
Vanguard Airlines : Zoom!

Caribbean
Caribbean Airlines : Caribbean Beat

South America
Aerolíneas Argentinas : Aerolineas Argentinas Magazine (formerly Alta), Cielos Argentinos
Avianca : Avianca
Copa Airlines : Panorama
Gol Linhas Aéreas Inteligentes : GOL
Grupo TACA : EXPLORE Magazine (defunct)
LAN Airlines : in, inWines, inPremiere
LATAM Airlines : Vamos / LATAM
Varig : Ícaro (defunct)

Europe 
Adria Airways : Adria Airways Inflight Magazine
Aegean Airlines : Blue
Aer Lingus : Cara
Aeroflot : Aeroflot, Aeroflot Premium, Aeroflot Style
Air France : Air France Magazine (Bon Voyage), Air France Madame - business class
Air Moldova : Altitude Inflight Magazine
Air Serbia : Elevate
airBaltic: Baltic Outlook
AirClub : AirClub Magazine
Alitalia : Ulisse, Griffair (shopping)
Blue Panorama Airlines : Mondo in Blue
bmi : Voyager
bmibaby : yeahbaby (defunct)
British Airways : High Life, Business Life - business class, First Life - first class
Brussels Airlines : b.there!, b.spirit! - long haul
Croatia Airlines: Croatia Magazine
easyJet : easyJet Traveller
Finnair : Blue Wings
 Flybe : Flight Time
 Iberia : Ronda, Excelente
 Icelandair: Stopover
 Jet Airlines & Jetwings Domestic and Jetwings International
 Jet2.com: JetAway Magazine
 KLM : Holland Herald
 Loganair : FlightLOG
 LOT Polish Airlines: Kaleidoscope
 Lufthansa : Lufthansa Magazin (Best Magazine in 2021), Woman's World, Lufthansa Exclusiv
  Luxair : Flydoscope
Martinair : M
 Meridiana: Atmosphere
 Nordstar : Летать легко (Easy to fly)
 Norwegian Air Shuttle : n Magazine 
 Pegasus Airlines : flypgs.com
 PrivatAir : PrivatAir Magazine
 Ryanair : Let's Go Magazine 
 S7 Airlines : S7 Magazine
 Scandinavian Airlines System : Scandinavian Traveler
 TAP Air Portugal : UP
 TAROM : Insight, SkyLady
 Thomas Cook : Thomas Cook Travel Magazine, Thomas Cook Emporium
 Thomson Airways : Inflight
 Turkish Airlines : Sky Life
 Ukraine International Airlines : Panorama
 Wizz Air : Wizz Magazine

Africa
Airlink : Skyways Magazine
Air Algérie : Tassili
Air Arabia Maroc: Nawras (Moroccan edition)
Air Zimbabwe : Nzira
Arik Air : Wings
Azman Air : Fly Safe
EgyptAir : Horus
Ethiopian Airlines : selamta
Fly Africa : Fly Africa Magazine
Kenya Airways : mSafiri
LAM : Índico
Max Air : In-flight Magazine
Royal Air Maroc : Royal Air Maroc Magazine
South African Airways : sawubona
TAAG : Austral

Middle Asia
Air Astana : Tengri Magazine
Uzbekistan Airways : Uzbekistan Airways

Asia
Air China : Wings of China 
Air India : Shubh Yatra (Happy Journey)
Air Macau : Air Macau Magazine
Air Mandalay : Air Mandalay - Golden Flight
AirAsia : Travel 360
AirAsia India :Travel 360
AirAsia X : Travel3Sixty
All Nippon Airways : Tsubasa no Okoku/ TSUBASA Global Wings
Angkasa : Kompas Gramedia
Asiana Airlines : Asiana
Bamboo Airways : Bamboo Green
Bangkok Airways : Fah Thai
Batik Air : Batik
Batik Air Malaysia : Batik
Biman Bangladesh Airlines : Bihanga
Cambodia Angkor Air : Angkor
Cathay Pacific : Discovery
Cebu Pacific : Smile 
China Airlines : Dynasty
China Eastern Airlines : Connections
China Southern Airlines: NiHao (English), Gateway 南方航空 (Chinese), Elite (Chinese)
Citilink : Linkers
Eastar Jet : Eastar Jet
EVA Air : enVoyage
Garuda Indonesia : Colours
GoAir : GoGetter
Hainan Airlines : Hai Vision
Hebei Airlines : Hebei Airlines
HK Express : Uexplore
Hong Kong Airlines : +852
IndiGo : Hello 6E
Indonesia AirAsia : Travel 3Sixty
Japan Airlines : Skyward
Jeju Air : Joy & Joy
Jetstar Airways : Jetstar Asia / Jetstar Japan 
Juneyao Airlines : The Moment
Korean Air : Morning Calm, Beyond
Lanmei Airlines : Time To Travel
Lao Airlines : Champa Meuanglao
Lion Air : Lionmag
Malaysia Airlines : Going Places
MIAT Mongolian Airlines : MIAT Mongolian Airlines
Nok Air : Jibjib
Novoair : Novoneel
Pakistan International Airlines : Humsafar
PAL Express : La Isla
Philippine Airlines : Mabuhay
Philippines AirAsia : Travel 3Sixty
Royal Brunei Airlines : Muhibah
Safi Airways : Safi Airways Inflight Magazine
Scoot : Scoot
Singapore Airlines : SilverKris
SpiceJet : SpiceRoute
SriLankan Airlines : Serendib
Sriwijaya Air : Sriwijaya
Starlux Airlines : kiânn
Thai AirAsia : Travel 3Sixty
Thai AirAsia X : Travel 3Sixty
Thai Airways : Sawasdee
Thai Lion Air : Lionmag Thai
Thai Smile : WE Smile
Thai Vietjet Air : One2Fly Thailand
Tigerair Taiwan : Tiger Tales
TransNusa : Pesona Nusantara
TruJet : Trujetter magazine 
TurboJet : Horizon
VietJet Air : One2Fly
Vietnam Airlines : Heritage (monthly), Heritage Fashion (monthly starting 15th day of the month), Heritage Japan (quarterly)
Vistara : Vistara Magazine
Wings Air : Wings
XiamenAir : XiamenAir
Xpress Air : Xpress Air

Middle East
Air Arabia: Nawras
Azerbaijan Airlines : AZAL Blue Sky
El Al : Atmosphere
Emirates : Open Skies and Portfolio for business and first class.
Etihad Airways : Etihad Inflight and Aspire
flynas : flynas magazine
Gulf Air : Gulf Life
Jazeera Airways : J Magazine
Kuwait Airways : Al-Buraq
Middle East Airlines : Cedar Wings
Oman Air : Wings of Oman
Qatar Airways : Oryx
Royal Jordanian : Royal Wings
Saudia : Ahlan Wasahlan
Saudigulf: Saudi Gulf magazine

Oceania
Air New Zealand : Kia Ora
Air Niugini : Paradise
Jetstar Airways : Jetstar Australia
Qantas : Qantas The Australian Way
Virgin Australia : Voyeur

Similar magazines

Quite similar to in-flight magazines, some railroad companies offer a comparable product aboard their long distance trains, e.g. Deutsche Bahn's mobil or Indian Railways' Rail Bandhu magazine. This magazine is also distributed via the seats of the passenger cars.

See also
 Aircraft safety card
 Sickness bag

References

Airline-related lists
Magazine publishing
Aviation magazines
 
Lists of magazines